Raston is a surname. Notable people with the surname include:

 Colin Raston (born 1950), Australian academic
 Willie Raston (born 1984), New Zealand former professional rugby league footballer
 Dina Temple-Raston (born 1965), American journalist

See also
 Ralston (surname)